Blue Mountain is an unincorporated community in Moffat County, in the U.S. state of Colorado.

History
Blue Mountain was founded sometime between 1910 and 1954. It is named for a nearby mountain, which is also called Blue Mountain.

The post office in Dinosaur serves Blue Mountain addresses.

References

Unincorporated communities in Moffat County, Colorado